Siege of Badajoz may refer to:

 Siege of Badajoz (1658)
 Siege of Badajoz (1705)
 First Siege of Badajoz (1811)
 Second Siege of Badajoz (1811)
 Siege of Badajoz (1812)

See also
 Battle of Badajoz (disambiguation)